Promacrochilo  is a genus of moths of the family Crambidae described by Stanisław Błeszyński in 1962. It contains only one species, Promacrochilo ambiguellus, described by Snellen in 1890, which is found in China (Hainan), India, Nepal, Myanmar, Thailand and Malaysia.

The forewings are yellow, with yellowish brown scales suffused along the veins and three dark brown spots at the middle of the cell. There is a series of dark brown spots from the costa to the middle of the inner margin. There is a blurry postmedial line on the hindwings from the costa to the inner margin.

References

Schoenobiinae
Monotypic moth genera
Moths of Asia
Crambidae genera
Taxa named by Stanisław Błeszyński